Gowardhan Sagar Lake is another prominent lake in the city of lakes, Udaipur. It is the smallest artificial lake of Udaipur. The lake is situated around 2.5 km from the south-west of Udaipur.

Geography 
Gowardhan Sagar Lake is 9 meters in depth and covers an area of 3750m. The Lake receives its water from Lake Pichola. It has been recorded that the reservoir has a fairly rich in fish and 32 species representing almost 9 families. The species, which are found very less are need to be conserve.

Lake restoration works 
The National Lake Conservation Program took 4 lakes of Udaipur under them. Goverdhan Sagar Lake was one of those lakes.

The key undertakings in the program includes: 

 Curbing pollution in the lakes
 Restrictions on mining activities in the catchment areas
 Conservation of wildlife around the lakes
 Restrictions on disposal of waste products and sewerage in the lakes

See also 

 List of dams and reservoirs in India
 List of lakes in India
 Udaipur
 Tourist Attractions in Udaipur

References 

Reservoirs in Rajasthan
Lakes of Udaipur
Tourist attractions in Udaipur
Udaipur district